West Coast Live (1985—2018) was a weekly two-hour radio variety show hosted by Sedge Thomson. The unscripted program features interviews with world-renowned authors and cultural figures along with performances by musicians, comedians and other entertainers. It is broadcast live-to-satellite each Saturday morning in front of a theater audience from one of several San Francisco Bay area venues. The show was carried on NPR stations from coast-to-coast, and in Paris, France until 2018. Occasionally, the show traveled to theaters, music festivals and film festivals throughout the northwest. The Biospherical Digital-Optical Aquaphone (container of water sloshed for microphone), is the "trademarked signature" of Sedge Thomson.

Past guests
Writers include: Diane Ackerman, Maya Angelou, Julian Barnes, T.C. Boyle, Ray Bradbury, A.S. Byatt, Joyce Carol Oates, Michael Chabon, Julia Child, Billy Collins, Junot Diaz, Jennifer Egan, Dave Eggers, Lawrence Ferlinghetti, Jonathan Safran Foer, William Gibson, Allen Ginsberg, Daniel Handler, Robert Hass, John Irving, Jamaica Kincaid, Anne Lamott, Gregory Maguire, Greil Marcus, Armistead Maupin, Michael McClure, Ian McEwan, Toni Morrison, Susan Orlean, P.J. O'Rourke, Raj Patel, Michael Pollan, Tom Robbins, Salman Rushdie, David Sedaris, Eric Schlosser, Zadie Smith, Gary Snyder, Calvin Trillin, Chris Van Allsburg, Tobias Wolff, Alice Walker, Alice Waters, Irvine Welsh, Edmund White, Jacqueline Winspear, Jeanette Winterson, Naomi Wolf, Tobias Wolff, Carlos Ruiz Zafón.

Musicians include: The Blind Boys of Alabama, Greensky Bluegrass, Tim Bluhm, Billy Bragg, The Neville Brothers, Greg Brown, Sam Bush, David Byrne, Bruce Cockburn, Judy Collins, Ramblin' Jack Elliott, Tommy Emmanuel, Michael Franti, Béla Fleck & The Flecktones, David Grisman, Arlo Guthrie, Ben Harper, Richie Havens, Sean Hayes, Dan Hicks, Jolie Holland, Zakir Hussain, The String Cheese Incident, Leo Kottke, Taj Mahal, Ladysmith Black Mambazo, Ray Manzarek, Country Joe McDonald, Tuck & Patti, U. Utah Phillips, Kronos Quartet, Jonathan Richman, Peter Rowan, Blame Sally, Pharoah Sanders, Merl Saunders, John Sebastian, Chris Smither, Allen Toussaint, Charlie Hunter Trio, Trance Mission, Hot Tuna, McCoy Tyner, The Devil Makes Three, Vetiver, Loudon Wainwright III.

Actors include: Carrie Fisher, Peter Gallagher, Elliott Gould, Gene Hackman, Larry Hankin, Bill Irwin, Eddie Izzard, Terry Jones, Rita Moreno, Adam Savage & Jamie Hyneman, Richard Lewis, Robin Williams, Debra Winger,
Geoff Bolt, Michael O'Brien
Others include: Andre Agassi, Jerry Brown, Roger Ebert, Wavy Gravy, Spalding Gray, Guerrilla Girls, Garrison Keillor, Craig Newmark, Peter Sellars, Steve Wozniak.

2015
 Nick Papadopoulous, CropMobster - December 19, 2015
 Steve Silberman, NeuroTribes - October 3, 2015

2014
 A. Scott Berg, Wilson - September 27, 2014
 Eric Schlosser, Command and Control - September 27, 2014
 Charles Saumarez Smith, Royal Academy of Arts - February 1, 2014

2013
 Dave Barry, Insane City - February 9, 2013
 Mo Willems - February 9, 2013

2012
 Claire Peaslee - December 22, 2012
 Anne Lamott, Help Thanks Wow - December 15, 2012 
 Raymond Offenheiser, Oxfam America - July 21, 2012
 Raj Patel, Stuffed and Starved - July 21, 2012
 Alice Waters, Owner of Chez Panisse Restaurant - July 21, 2012
 Raj Patel, Raymond Offenheiser & Alice Waters - July 21, 2012
 Howard Rheingold, Netsmart: How to Thrive Online - June 16, 2012
 Dhaya Lakshminarayanan - June 16, 2012
 Juliet Bell (aka Sylvia Brownrigg), Keplers Dream - May 12, 2012
 Edmund White, Jack Holmes and His Friend - February 4, 2012
 Barbara Babcock, Woman Lawyer - February 4, 2012
 Maira Kalman, Why We Broke Up - February 4, 2012
 Ellis Avery, The Last Nude - January 14, 2012
 Nicholas de Monchaux, Fashioning Apollo - January 14, 2012
 Julia Flynn Siler, Lost Kingdom - January 7, 2012

2011
 Thomas Steinbeck, The Silver Lotus - December 10, 2011
 Mark Bowden, Worm: The First Digital World War - October 22, 2011
 Courtney E Smith, Record Collecting for Girls - September 10, 2011
 Rita Moreno, Life WIthout Makeup - September 10, 2011
 Adam Hochschild, To End All Wars - April 30, 2011
 Eric Greitens, The Heart and The Fist - April 30, 2011
 Daniel Clowes - April 23, 2011
 Donovan Hohn, Moby Duck & Susan Freinkel, Plastic - April 23, 2011
 Jacques dAmboise, I Was a Dancer - April 9, 2011
 Joyce Carol Oates, A Widows Story - April 2, 2011

2010
 Judy Chicago, Frida Kahlo: Face to Face - December 11, 2010
 Coleman Barks, Rumi the Big Red Book - December 11, 2010
 Armistead Maupin, Mary Ann in Autumn - December 11, 2010
 Daniel Handler AKA Lemony Snicket, 13 Words - November 13, 2010
 Terry McMillan, Getting to Happy - November 13, 2010
 Alice Walker,  Hard Times Require Furious Dancing- October 30, 2010
 Alexander McCall Smith, The Lost Art of Gratitude - October 23, 2010
 Julia Butterfly Hill, The Legacy of Luna - April 17, 2010
 Zachary Mason, The Lost Books of Odysseus - March 6, 2010
 TC Boyle, Wild Child - February 20, 2010

2009
 Andre Agassi, Open: An Autobiography - November 21, 2009
 Jonathan Safran Foer, Eating Animals - November 7, 2009
 John Irving, Last Night in Twisted River - November 7, 2009
 Ben Fong Torres - August 8, 2009
 Ruth Reichl, Not Becoming my Mother - May 9, 2009
 Geoffrey Masson - May 2, 2009
 Jane E Smith - May 2, 2009
 Jane Vandenburgh - April 25, 2009
 Lynn Freed - April 25, 2009
 Alva Noe - April 11, 2009
 Brenda Webster - April 11, 2009
 RuthReichl_2009_05_09
 Alan Boss - March 14, 2009
 Zoe Heller, The Believers - March 7, 2009
 Barry Jenkins, Medicine for Melancholy - March 7, 2009
 Joe Gores, Spade and Archer - February 28, 2009
 Jacqueline Winspear, Among the Mad - 
 February 28, 2009
 Stacey DErasmo, The Sky Below - January 17, 2009
 Robert Roper, Now the Drum of War - January 17, 2009
 Wes Nisker - January 10, 2009

2008
 Spain Rodriguez, CHE, A Graphic Biography - December 13, 2008
 Maxine Hong Kingston - November 29, 2008
 Toni Morrison, A Mercy - November 22, 2008
 Eoin Colfer, The Worst Boy in the World - May 24, 2008
 Sylvia Brownrigg, 
 Morality Tale - May 10, 2008
 Rabih Alameddine, Hakawati - May 10, 2008
 Robert Bly and Eavan Boland - May 3, 2008
 Elizabeth McKenzie, McGregor Tells the World - May 3, 2008
 Richard Price, Lush Life - March 29, 2008
 Gene Hackman and Daniel Lenihan, Wake of the Perdido Star - February 16, 2008
 James McBride, Song Yet Sung - February 9, 2008
 Roy Blount Jr, Long Time Leaving - February 2, 2008
 Calvin Trillin - February 2, 2008
 Ricki Lake & Abby Epstein, The Business of Being Born - January 19, 2008
 Michael Pollan, In Defense of Food  - January 19, 2008

2007
 Robert Hass, Time and Materials - December 8, 2007
 Alice Waters, The Art of Simple Food - November 24, 2007
 Bill Pullman - September 8, 2007
 Michael Chabon - June 16, 2007
 Josh Waitzkin, Searching for Bobby Fisher - June 16, 2007
 Mal Sharpe - May 26, 2007
 Helen Simpson, In the Drivers Seat - May 26, 2007
 Julia Whitty - May 26, 2007
 Bill Bryson - May 12, 2007

2006
 Craig Newmark - November 4, 2006
 Mark Childress, One Mississippi - August 19, 2006
 Carolyn Cooke - August 12, 2006
 Sylvia Brownrigg, The Delivery Room - July 8, 2006
 Ben Fong Torres, Almost Famous - June 10, 2006
 Gary Shteyngart, Absurdistan - May 13, 2006
 John Baxter, Well Always Have Paris - April 1, 2006
 Julian Barnes, Arthur and George - February 11, 2006
 Mary Roach, Spook- February 4, 2006
 Ayelet Waldman, Love and Other Impossible Pursuits - February 4, 2006
 Allan Zweibel, The Other Shulman - February 4, 2006
 Matthew and Terces Anglehart, The Abounding River - January 28, 2006

2005
 Doris Kearns Goodwin, Team of Rivals: The Political Genius of Abraham Lincoln - December 3, 2005
 Michael Recchiuti and Fran Gage - November 26, 2005
 Will Durst - October 22, 2005
 Howard Junker, Zyzzyva - October 15, 2005
 Gus Lee, China Boy - October 15, 2005
 Terry McMillan, The Interruption of Everything - August 20, 2005
 Melissa Bank, The Wonder Spot 
 - June 11, 2005
 David Sedaris, Dress your Family in Corduroy and Denim - June 11, 2005
 Robert Bly - May 14, 2005
 Marc Ian Barasch, Field Notes on the Compassionate Life - May 7, 2005
 SARK, Sarks New Creative Companion: Ways to Free Your Creative Spirit - May 7, 2005
 Les Barker - February 19, 2005
 Irvin Yalom - February 19, 2005

2004
 Nigella Lawson, Feast: Food to Celebrate - November 20, 2004
 Maya Angelou - October 16, 2004
 Guy Johnson- October 16, 2004
 Carl and Karl- October 2, 2004
 Annie Somerville, Greens Restaurant Chef - August 28, 2004
 David Sedaris - June 19, 2004
 Isabel Allende, Adventure Stories, My Invented Country: A Memoir - May 15, 2004
 Lang Lang, pianist and raconteur - Nov. 13, 2004

2003
 Amy Tan - December 13, 2003
 Kathy Kamen Goldmark - August 9, 2003
 Sarah Jones - May 17, 2003
 Paul Disco - May 3, 2003
 Norman Fisher - May 3, 2003
 Noah Levine - May 3, 2003
 Paul Collins - April 12, 2003
 Po Bronson - February 8, 2003
 William Gibson - February 8, 2003
 Sarah Jones - February 1, 2003
 AS Byatt - January 25, 2003

2002
 Salman Rushdie - September 28, 2002
 Alan Bennett- August 8, 2002
 Margaret Cho - July 13, 2002
 Anne Packer - July 13, 2002
 Eric Schlosser - January 26, 2002
 Steve Wozniak - January 26, 2002
 Lily Tomlin - January 12, 2002
 Rebecca Walker - January 12, 2002

2001
 Lawrence Ferlinghetti - October 13, 2001
 Dave Eggers & Zadie Smith - July 21, 2001
 Doris Haddock "Granny D" - May 5, 2001

2000
 David Sedaris - June 17, 2000
 Eddie Izzard - June 10, 2000

1999
 Spalding Gray - January 2, 1999

1998
 Joe Quirk - March 28, 1998

1997
 Alice Walker - May 10, 1997
 Francesco Rosi - May 3, 1997
 Marilyn Yalom - March 1, 1997
 Oliver Sacks - February 22, 1997
 Dean Koontz - February 22, 1997
 Robert Girardi - February 8, 1997
 Diane Johnson - February 8, 1997
 Diane Ackerman - February 8, 1997
 Rigo97 - February 8, 1997

1996
 Gary Snyder - December 14, 1996
 Julia Child - November 16, 1996
 Hettie Jones - October 10, 1996
 Dennis Hopper - October 5, 1996
 Ruth Weiss - October 12, 1996
 Charles Schultz - September 7, 1996
 Jennifer Egan - May 9, 1996
 Gus Lee - March 30, 1996
 Jamaica Kincaid - February 10, 1996
 Anne Lamott - January 6, 1996

1995
 Tobias Wolff - November 11, 1995
 Gregory Maguire - October 14, 1995
 David Byrne - October 7, 1995
 John Berendt - September 23, 1995
 Anne Lamott - June 3, 1995
 Ray Bradbury & Robert Watson - June 3, 1995
 Paulo Coelho - May 27, 1995
 Thomas Keneally - May 6, 1995
 Oliver Sacks - March 4, 1995
 Helen Palmer - January 21, 1995

1994
 Sylvia Earl - December 12, 1994
 Anne Lamott - December 12, 1994
 Karl and Carl - December 12, 1994
 Meredith Tromble - December 12, 1994
 Ian Frazier - December 3, 1994
 Lucy Grealy - December 3, 1994
 Howard Rheingold - December 10, 1994
 Josh Kornbluth - October 15, 1994
 Naa Kahidi - October 15, 1994
 Terry Jones - October 22, 1994
 George Takei, To the Stars - September 24, 1994
 Allen Ginsberg - September 17, 1994
 Michael McClure - August 6, 1994
 James Houston - July 9, 1994
 Bill Barich - July 2, 1994
 Whitfield Diffie  - July 2, 1994
 Paul Theroux - March 19, 1994

1991
 Sedge Thomson, Total Solar Eclipse, Baja California - July 11, 1991

Venues
 The Freight and Salvage
 Yoshi's (jazz club)
 San Francisco Museum of Modern Art
 San Francisco Ferry Building
 142 Throckmorton Theatre
 The Chapel
 The Empire Plush Room
 Cowell Theater at Fort Mason
 Venetian Room at the Fairmont Hotel
 Oregon Shakespeare Festival
 High Sierra Music Festival
 Kate Wolf Memorial Music Festival

References

External links
 West Coast Live official webpage
 where to hear West Coast Live

American public radio programs
American talk radio programs
1992 radio programme debuts